Bentheuphausia amblyops, the deep sea krill is a species of krill. B. amblyops is the only species within its genus, which in turn is the only genus within the family Bentheuphausiidae. All the 85 other species of krill known are classified in the family Euphausiidae.

Distribution
B. amblyops occurs in the northern Atlantic Ocean in latitudes south of 40° N, and also in the southern seas of the Atlantic, in the Indian Ocean and in the Pacific. It is a bathypelagic krill that lives in deep waters below .

Description
It is distinguished from the Euphausiidae by several morphological features, the most apparent being that they are not bioluminescent and that their first pair of pleopods is not modified as copulatory tool organs. Also, their eyes are smaller than those of the Euphausiidae.

References

External links
 Distribution data set of Bentheuphausia ambylops from OBIS.

Krill
Monotypic crustacean genera